The following is a hierarchical outline of the Czechoslovak People's Army at the end of the Cold War. It is intended to convey the connections and relationships between units and formations. At the end of the Cold War in 1989 the Czechoslovak People's Army structure was as follows.

The details are based on the Czech Ministerstvo narodni obrany website, which lists all units of the Czechoslovak People's Army in existence between 1950 and 1990, with their location, subordination, equipment and changes over time.

Ministry of National Defence 
 Ministry of National Defence in Prague
 Main Missile Troops and Artillery Directorate
 Central Ammunition Depot in Týniště nad Orlicí
 6th Armament Base in Olomouc
 Ammunition Depot Hronsek
 Ammunition Depot Sklené
 Ammunition Depot Trenčín
 Ammunition Depot Poprad
 Military Repair Plant Moldava nad Bodvou
 Separate Ammunition Depot Moldava nad Bodvou
 Military Repair Plant Nováky
 Separate Ammunition Depot Nováky
 Main Political Department
 Political Military Academy in Bratislava
 Main Medical Department
 Main Military Transport Directorate
 150th Military Traffic Office in Čierna nad Tisou
 Main Construction and Accommodation Directorate
 1st Road Construction Brigade in Pardubice
 103rd Road Construction Battalion in Klecany
 104th Road Construction Battalion in Nepomuk
 107th Road Construction Battalion in Chrudim
 108th Road Construction Battalion in Prague
 109th Road Construction Battalion in Stará Boleslav
 112th Road Construction Battalion in České Budějovice
 113th Road Construction Battalion in Týn nad Vltavou
 115th Road Construction Battalion in Týn nad Vltavou
 116th Road Construction Battalion in Horažďovice
 2nd Road Construction Brigade in Bratislava
 101st Road Construction Battalion in Vyškov
 102nd Road Construction Battalion in Liptovský Mikuláš
 105th Road Construction Battalion in Bratislava
 106th Road Construction Battalion in Levice
 110th Road Construction Battalion in Zbraslav
 114th Road Construction Battalion in Levice
 Equipment Department
 Quartermaster Department
 Combat Training Department
 Educational Department
 Military Ground Forces University in Vyškov
 Military Air Forces University in Košice
 1st Air School Regiment in Přerov with MiG-21F-13 fighters
 1st Flight School Squadron
 2nd Flight School Squadron
 3rd Flight School Squadron
 4th Flight School Squadron
 28th Air Base Battalion
 11th Electronic Support Battalion
 2nd Air School Regiment in Košice with Aero L-29 Delfín and L-39 Albatros jet trainers
 1st Flight School Squadron
 2nd Flight School Squadron
 3rd Flight School Squadron
 4th Flight School Squadron
 20th Air Base Battalion
 4th Electronic Support Battalion
 3rd Air School Regiment in Piešťany with Mi-2 helicopters
 1st Flight School Squadron
 2nd Flight School Squadron
 3rd Air Base and Electronic Support Battalion
 Foreign Air Forces Training Center in Košice
 10th Military Air Forces Maintenance Center in Prešov
 Military Technical University in Liptovský Mikuláš
 Engineer Troops Department
 Repair Base 042 in Olomouc
 Fuel Distribution Department
 Chemical Troops Department
 NBC-detection Center in Hostivice
 Professional Sport Army Center DUKLA in Banská Bystrica
 Veterinary Service Section
 Military Veterinary Research and Training Institute in Košice
 Automobile Repair Plant Zlatovce in Trenčín
 Central Tank and Automobile Depot in Nitra

General Staff of the Czechoslovak People's Army 

 General Staff of the Czechoslovak People's Army in Prague
 Main Intelligence Directorate
 78th Special Purpose Radio Center in Litoměřice
 22nd Special Purpose Airborne Brigade in Prostějov
 Headquarters and Staff Company
 1st Special Reconnaissance Division
 2nd Special Reconnaissance Division
 3rd Special Reconnaissance Division
 Support Weapons Company
 Special Signal Center
 Training Center
 Main Operations Directorate
 101st Headquarters Battalion in Prague
 102nd Headquarters Battalion in Prague
 Main Signal Troops Directorate
 Signal Operating Center
 Signal Node of the General Staff
 Topographical Department
 Military Topographic Institute in Dobruška
 Military Cartographic Institute in Harmanec
 Military Geographic Institute in Prague
 5th Geodetic Detachment in Opava
 Central Topographic Maps Depot in Prague
 Research Center 090 in Prague

Western Military District 

 Western Military District in Tábor
 2nd Headquarters Regiment in Tábor
 247th Support Battalion in Tábor (Code Name for the Intelligence Directorate of the Western Military District)
 6th Headquarters Guard Battalion in Příbram
 71st Airborne Assault Battalion in Chrudim
 Headquarters Platoon
 Parachute Airborne Company
 Anti-tank Squad
 Mortar Squad
 Supply Platoon
 7th Artillery Division in Pardubice
 17th High Power Artillery Division in Žamberk
 Command and Artillery Reconnaissance Battery
 1st Self-propelled Guns Battery with 4x 203mm 2S7 Pion self-propelled guns
 2nd Self-propelled Guns Battery with 4x 203mm 2S7 Pion self-propelled guns
 Self-propelled Mortars Battery with 4x 240mm 2S4 Tyulpan self-propelled mortars
 71st Cannon Artillery Brigade in Žamberk
 Command and Artillery Reconnaissance Battery
 1st Cannon Artillery Division with 18x 130mm M1954 towed howitzers
 2nd Cannon Artillery Division with 18x 130mm M1954 towed howitzers
 3rd Cannon Artillery Division with 18x 130mm M1954 towed howitzers
 4th Cannon Artillery Division with 18x 130mm M1954 towed howitzers
 Transport Company
 74th Rocket Launcher Brigade (a reserve formation only activated in war)
 Command and Artillery Reconnaissance Battery
 1st Rocket Launcher Division with 18x RM-70 122mm multiple rocket launchers
 2nd Rocket Launcher Division with 18x RM-70 122mm multiple rocket launchers
 3rd Rocket Launcher Division with 18x RM-70 122mm multiple rocket launchers
 4th Rocket Launcher Division with 18x RM-70 122mm multiple rocket launchers
 75th Heavy Howitzer Artillery Brigade in Pardubice
 Command and Artillery Reconnaissance Battery
 1st Heavy Howitzer Artillery Division with 18x 152mm SpGH DANA self-propelled howitzers
 2nd Heavy Howitzer Artillery Division with 18x 152mm SpGH DANA self-propelled howitzers
 3rd Heavy Howitzer Artillery Division with 18x 152mm SpGH DANA self-propelled howitzers
 4th Heavy Howitzer Artillery Division with 18x 152mm SpGH DANA self-propelled howitzers
 311th Heavy Artillery Brigade in Jince
 11th Heavy Artillery Division with SS-1C Scud-B tactical ballistic missiles
 12th Heavy Artillery Division with SS-1C Scud-B tactical ballistic missiles
 13th Heavy Artillery Division with OTR-23 Oka theatre ballistic missiles
 82nd Anti-Aircraft Missile Brigade in Jihlava
 183rd Anti-Aircraft Missile Battalion with 2K11 Krug systems
 185th Anti-Aircraft Missile Battalion with 2K11 Krug systems
 187th Anti-Aircraft Missile Battalion with 2K11 Krug systems
 1st Transport Brigade in Olomouc
 1st Transport Battalion in Vysoké Mýto
 3rd Transport Battalion in Česká Třebová
 16th Fuel Transport Battalion in Čáslav
 16th Transport Battalion in Senica
 3rd Transport Brigade in Hlučín
 66th Transport Battalion in Vrútky
 73rd Transport Battalion in Hlučín
 74th Transport Battalion in Vrútky
 76th Fuel Transport Battalion in Čereňany
 11th Supply Brigade in Bílina
 11th Transport Battalion in Dobříš
 12th Transport Battalion in Nechranice
 13th Transport Battalion in Nechranice
 14th Transport Battalion in Lešany
 15th Fuel Transport Battalion in Stříbro
 98th Medical Evacuation Battalion in Terezín
 21st Supply Brigade in Pardubice
 21st Transport Battalion in Pardubice
 22nd Transport Battalion in Bílek
 23rd Transport Battalion in Dolní Bousov
 24th Transport Battalion in Čáslav
 25th Fuel Transport Battalion in Pardubice
 38th Medical Evacuation Battalion in Těchonín
 58th Medical Evacuation Battalion in Znojmo
 7th Road Bridge Engineer Brigade in Hodonín
 74th Road Engineer Battalion in Rajhrad
 75th Road Bridge Engineer Battalion in Znojmo
 78th Pontoon Bridge Battalion in Hodonín
 78th Engineer Material Depot in Hodonín
 10th Pontoon Bridge Brigade in Kostelec nad Labem
 101st Pontoon Battalion
 102nd Pontoon Battalion
 103rd Pontoon Battalion
 104th Pontoon Battalion
 10th Transport Battalion 
 32nd Road Engineer Brigade in Horní Počaply
 251st Road Engineer Battalion in Bílina
 252nd Road Engineer Battalion in Prachatice
 253rd Road Engineer Battalion in Horní Počaply
 254th Road Construction Battalion in Přelouč
 255th Road Bridge Engineer Battalion in Horní Počaply
 256th Special Road Bridge Engineer Battalion Teplice
 5th Signal Brigade in Strašice
 1st Signal Battalion
 2nd Signal Battalion 
 3rd Signal Battalion
 6th Radio-technical Brigade in Plzeň
 6th Operating Battalion
 66th Radio-technical Battalion with P-15 UH and P-18 VHF radars and 1RL111D target acquisition radars
 67th Radio-technical Battalion with PRV-16 radar altimeters
 7th Special Purpose Electronic Intelligence Brigade in Zbiroh
 60th Signal Battalion in Unhošť
 Headquarters Company
 Operating Company
 Radio Telex Company
 Special Purpose Radio Company
 77th Special Purpose Electronic Intelligence Battalion in Velká Hleďsebe
 77th Radio Surveying SW Company
 77th Radio Surveying VHF Company
 77th Radio Surveying and Targeting Company
 77th Automatic Radio Surveying and Targeting Company
 77th Combat Support and Services Company
 78th Special Purpose Electronic Intelligence Battalion in Klenčí pod Čerchovem
 78th Radio Surveying HF Company
 78th Radio Surveying VHF Company
 78th Radio Surveying and Targeting Company
 78th Automatic Radio Surveying and Targeting Company
 78th Combat Support and Services Company
 79th Special Purpose Electronic Intelligence Battalion in Litoměřice
 79th Radio Surveying HF Company
 79th Radio Targeting MIDDLE Company
 79th Combat Support and Services Company
 701st Radio Targeting Special Purpose Company
 702nd Radio Targeting Special Purpose Company
 703rd Radio Targeting Special Purpose Company
 704th Radio Targeting Special Purpose Company
 52nd Long Distance Signal Communications Brigade in Lipník nad Bečvou
 1st NCO Training Battalion
 2nd Cable Battalion
 3rd Radio Relay Battalion
 Maintenance Company
 Support Company 
 59th Directional Stations Signal Brigade in Beroun
 1st Battalion
 2nd Battalion
 3rd Battalion
 4th Battalion
 102nd Chemical Defence Brigade in Liberec
 51st Chemical Protection Battalion
 61st Field Decontamination Battalion
 77th Radiation and Chemical Reconnaissance Battalion
 65th Equipment Decontamination Battalion
 1st Electronic Warfare Regiment in Kolín
 11th Tank Maintenance Regiment in Hrdly
 1st Civil Defence Regiment in Kutná Hora
 4th Civil Defence Regiment in Varnsdorf
 7th Civil Defence Regiment in Bučovice
 31st Command and Reconnaissance Squadron in Bechyně
 1st Helicopter Detachment
 2nd Helicopter Detachment
 31st Air Base and Electronic Support Company
 10th Anti-aircraft Systems Maintenance Base in Jaroměř
 2K12 Kub Technical Battery
 2K11 Krug Technical Battery
 Transport Battery
 11th Artillery Base in Jince
 41st Artillery Transport Battalion in Dašice
 1st Transport Battery
 2nd Transport Battery (Reserve unit)
 Signal Battery
 Logistic Platoon
 Service Platoon
 311th Tank Training Battalion at the Hradiště Military Training Area
 313th Tank Training Battalion at the Boletice Military Training Area
 1st District Tank Depot in Ústí nad Orlicí, with branches in Zdice and Vamberk
 1st District Quartermaster Material Depot in Rychnovek, with branches in Terezín and České Budějovice
 1st District Engineer Depot in Dolní Bousov, with branches in Janská, Jaroměř, Dobříš and Hněvkovice
 1st District Signal Depot and Maintenance Base in Červené Pečky, with a branch in Červený Újezd
 1st District Chemical Defence Depot in Račice nad Trotinou, with branches in Rumburk, Olomouc and Zásmuky
 1st District Transport Depot in Nový Jičín, with branches in Poprad, Nemecká, Vysoké Mýto, Kutná Hora and Ostrava
 1st District Political and Educational Material Depot in České Budějovice, with branches in Brno and Čáslav
 1st District Equipment Depot in Jaroměř, with branches in Brno and Staré Město
 1st District Fuel Depot in Chlumec nad Cidlinou, with branches in Halenkov and Mošnov
 1st District Medical Equipment Depot in Liberec, with branches in Dobrá, Golčův Jeníkov and Krásná Lípa
 1st District Building Materials Depot in Hradec Králové
 2nd Armaments Depot in Jaroměř, with a branch in Terezín
 21st Bridging Equipment Depot in Chrudim

1st Army 

 1st Army in Příbram:
 1st Headquarters Battalion in Příbram
 1st Tank Division in Slaný (in case of full mobilization would have also formed the 16th Tank Division)
 1st Tank Regiment in Strašice
 2nd Tank Regiment in Rakovník
 21st Tank Regiment in Žatec
 3rd Motor Rifle Regiment in Louny with BVP-2 tracked infantry fighting vehicles
 1st Artillery Regiment in Terezín
 1st Separate Rocket Launcher Division in Terezín with OTR-21 Tochka tactical ballistic missiles
 13th Separate Rocket Launcher Division in Čihadla with 9K52 Luna-M artillery rocket systems
 1st Command and Artillery Reconnaissance Battery in Slaný
 5th Anti-Aircraft Missile Regiment in Žatec with 9K33 Osa surface-to-air missile systems
 1st Reconnaissance Battalion in Podbořany
 3rd Engineer Battalion in Terezín
 2nd Signal Battalion in Slaný
 1st Supply Battalion in Bílina
 1st Maintenance Battalion in Žatec
 5th Chemical Defence Battalion in Slaný
 5th Medical Battalion in Terezín
 2nd Motor Rifle Division  in Sušice
 23rd Tank Regiment in Holýšov
 10th Motor Rifle Regiment in Janovice nad Úhlavou with BVP-1 tracked infantry fighting vehicles
 11th Motor Rifle Regiment in Klatovy with OT-64 wheeled armored transports vehicles
 12th Motor Rifle Regiment in Domažlice with OT-64 wheeled armored transports vehicles
 8th Artillery Regiment in Klatovy
 2nd Separate Rocket Launcher Division in Holýšov with 9K52 Luna-M artillery rocket systems
 2nd Command and Artillery Reconnaissance Battery in Sušice
 2nd Anti-Aircraft Missile Regiment in Janovice nad Úhlavou with 2K12 Kub surface-to-air missile systems
 2nd Reconnaissance Battalion in Janovice nad Úhlavou
 4th Engineer Battalion in Střelské Hoštice
 4th Signal Battalion in Sušice
 2nd Supply Battalion Klatovy
 2nd Maintenance Battalion in Klatovy
 2nd Chemical Defence Battalion in Kdyně
 2nd Medical Battalion
 19th Motor Rifle Division in Plzeň
 11th Tank Regiment in Plzeň
 57th Motor Rifle Regiment in Stříbro with BVP-1 tracked infantry fighting vehicles
 67th Motor Rifle Regiment in Bor with BVP-2 tracked infantry fighting vehicles
 104th Motor Rifle Regiment in Tachov with OT-64 wheeled armored transports vehicles
 47th Artillery Regiment in Plzeň
 19th Separate Rocket Launcher Division in Bor with 9K52 Luna-M artillery rocket systems
 19th Command and Artillery Reconnaissance Battery in Plzeň
 11th Anti-Aircraft Missile Regiment in Stříbro with 2K12 Kub surface-to-air missile systems
 19th Reconnaissance Battalion in Tachov
 11th Engineer Battalion in Plzeň
 11th Signal Battalion in Plzeň
 19th Supply Battalion in Příchovice
 19th Maintenance Battalion in Plzeň
 11th Chemical Defence Battalion in Plzeň
 11th Medical Battalion
 20th Motor Rifle Division in Karlovy Vary
 12th Tank Regiment in Podbořany
 49th Motor Rifle Regiment in Mariánské Lázně with BVP-1 tracked infantry fighting vehicles
 65th Motor Rifle Regiment in Cheb with OT-64 wheeled armored transports vehicles
 74th Motor Rifle Regiment in Karlovy Vary with OT-64 wheeled armored transports vehicles
 38th Artillery Regiment in Kynšperk nad Ohří
 20th Separate Rocket Launcher Division in Stružná with 9K52 Luna-M artillery rocket systems
 20th Command and Artillery Reconnaissance Battery in Karlovy Vary
 12th Anti-Aircraft Missile Regiment in Mariánské Lázně with 2K12 Kub surface-to-air missile systems
 20th Reconnaissance Battalion in Cheb
 12th Engineer Battalion in Kadaň
 12th Signal Battalion in Karlovy Vary
 20th Supply Battalion in Ostrov
 20th Maintenance Battalion in Podbořany
 12th Chemical Defence Battalion in Karlovy Vary
 12th Medical Battalion
 321st Heavy Artillery Brigade in Rokycany
 21st Heavy Artillery Division with SS-1C Scud-B tactical ballistic missiles
 22nd Heavy Artillery Division with SS-1C Scud-B tactical ballistic missiles
 21st Artillery Base in Kostelec nad Orlicí servicing the missiles of the 321st Heavy Artillery Brigade
 322nd Cannon Artillery Brigade in Dobřany
 Command and Artillery Reconnaissance Battery
 1st Cannon Artillery Division with 18x 130mm M1954 towed howitzers
 2nd Cannon Artillery Division with 18x 130mm M1954 towed howitzers
 3rd Cannon Artillery Division with 18x 152mm SpGH DANA self-propelled howitzers
 4th Cannon Artillery Division with 18x 152mm SpGH DANA self-propelled howitzers
 5th Cannon Artillery Division with 18x 152mm SpGH DANA self-propelled howitzers
 51st Engineer Brigade in Litoměřice
 Engineer Battalion
 Engineer Battalion
 Engineer Battalion
 51st Engineer Roadblocking Battalion
 51st Engineer Transit Battalion
 1st Supply Brigade in Terezín
 2nd Transport Battalion in Terezín
 3rd Transport Battalion in Terezín
 4th Transport Battalion in Terezín
 5th Transport Battalion in Terezín
 6th Fuel Transport Battalion in Rakovník
 175th Medical Evacuation Battalion in Nechranice
 171st Anti-aircraft Missile Regiment in Rožmitál pod Třemšínem with 20x 2K12 Kub surface-to-air missile systems
 Headquarters Battery
 1st Firing Battery
 2nd Firing Battery
 3rd Firing Battery
 4th Firing Battery
 5th Firing Battery
 Technical Battery
 216th Anti-tank Regiment in Most
 1st Anti-tank Division with 12x 100mm vz. 53 anti-tank cannons and 6x BRDM-2 vehicles in the anti-tank variant with Konkurs anti-tank missiles
 2nd Anti-tank Division with 12x 100mm vz. 53 anti-tank cannons and 6x BRDM-2 vehicles in the anti-tank variant with Konkurs anti-tank missiles
 3rd Anti-tank Division with 12x 100mm vz. 53 anti-tank cannons and 6x BRDM-2 vehicles in the anti-tank variant with Konkurs anti-tank missiles
 91st Pontoon Regiment in Litoměřice
 1st Signal Regiment in Plzeň-Bory
 1st Signal Battalion
 2nd Signal Battalion 
 3rd Signal Battalion
 11th Long Distance Signal Communications Regiment in Plzeň
 3rd Electronic Warfare Regiment in Mariánské Lázně
 71st Special Purpose Electronic Intelligence Regiment in Kladno
 71st Radio Surveying HF Company
 71st Radio Surveying VHF Company
 71st Radio Surveying and Targeting Company
 71st Automatic Radio Surveying and Targeting Company
 71st Combat Support and Services Company
 1st Reconnaissance Artillery Division in Holýšov
 1st Radio-technical Battalion in Holýšov
 Light Radio-technical Company
 Heavy Radio-technical Company
 Signal Company
 103rd Chemical Defence Battalion in Lešany
 11th Road Construction Battalion in Horažďovice
 1st Radiation Center in Příbram
 1st Command and Reconnaissance Squadron in Plzeň-Bory
 1st Helicopter Detachment with 2x Mi-2 helicopters to support the 1st Tank Division in wartime
 2nd Helicopter Detachment with 2x Mi-2 helicopters to support the 2nd Motor Rifle Division in wartime
 19th Helicopter Detachment with 2x Mi-2 helicopters to support the 19th Motor Rifle Division in wartime
 20th Helicopter Detachment with 2x Mi-2 helicopters to support the 20th Motor Rifle Division in wartime
 1st Air Base and Electronic Support Company
 101st Unmanned Aerial Vehicle Reconnaissance Squadron in Stříbro with Tupolev Tu-143 VR-3 Rejs drones
 11th Signal and Radio-technical Services Company in Příbram

4th Army 

 4th Army in Písek:
 4th Headquarters Battalion in Písek
 3rd Motor Rifle Division in Kroměříž (in case of full mobilization would have also formed the 26th Motor Rifle Division)
 33rd Tank Regiment in Přáslavice
 4th Motor Rifle Regiment in Hodonín with OT-64 wheeled armored transports vehicles
 5th Motor Rifle Regiment in Mikulov with BVP-1 tracked infantry fighting vehicles
 6th Motor Rifle Regiment in Uherské Hradiště with OT-64 wheeled armored transports vehicles
 361st Artillery Regiment in Hranice
 14th Separate Rocket Launcher Division in Přáslavice with 9K52 Luna-M artillery rocket systems
 3rd Command and Artillery Reconnaissance Battery in Kroměříž
 13th Anti-Aircraft Regiment in Bzenec 
 3rd Reconnaissance Battalion in Kroměříž
 2nd Engineer Battalion in Břeclav
 3rd Signal Battalion in Kroměříž
 3rd Supply Battalion in Kroměříž
 3rd Maintenance Battalion in Kroměříž
 13th Chemical Defence Battalion in Bzenec
 13th Medical Battalion
 4th Tank Division in Havlíčkův Brod
 7th Tank Regiment in Jindřichův Hradec
 8th Tank Regiment in Jihlava
 13th Tank Regiment in Čáslav
 9th Motor Rifle Regiment in Znojmo with BVP-1 tracked infantry fighting vehicles
 6th Artillery Regiment in Jemnice
 4th Separate Rocket Launcher Division in Jemčina with 9K52 Luna-M artillery rocket systems
 4th Command and Artillery Reconnaissance Battery in Havlíčkův Brod
 4th Anti-Aircraft Missile Regiment in Bzenec with 2K12 Kub surface-to-air missile systems
 4th Reconnaissance Battalion in Jindřichův Hradec
 6th Engineer Battalion in Jindřichův Hradec
 5th Signal Battalion in Havlíčkův Brod
 4th Supply Battalion in Havlíčkův Brod
 4th Maintenance Battalion in Jihlava
 6th Chemical Defence Battalion in Havlíčkův Brod
 6th Medical Battalion
 9th Tank Division in Tábor
 14th Tank Regiment in Písek
 17th Tank Regiment in Týn nad Vltavou
 18th Tank Regiment in Tábor
 79th Motor Rifle Regiment in Benešov with BVP-2 tracked infantry fighting vehicles
 362nd Artillery Regiment in Lešany
 9th Separate Rocket Launcher Division in Jistebnice with OTR-21 Tochka tactical ballistic missiles
 9th Command and Artillery Reconnaissance Battery in Jistebnice
 9th Anti-Aircraft Missile Regiment in Strakonice with 2K12 Kub surface-to-air missile systems
 9th Reconnaissance Battalion in Kašperské Hory
 8th Engineer Battalion in Týn nad Vltavou
 9th Signal Battalion in Tábor
 9th Supply Battalion in Písek
 9th Maintenance Battalion in Písek
 4th Chemical Defence Battalion in Vráž
 4th Medical Battalion
 15th Motor Rifle Division in České Budějovice (in case of full mobilization would have also formed the 18th Motor Rifle Division)
 20th Tank Regiment in České Budějovice
 51st Motor Rifle Regiment in Český Krumlov with OT-64 wheeled armored transports vehicles
 62nd Motor Rifle Regiment in Prachatice with BVP-1 tracked infantry fighting vehicles
 68th Motor Rifle Regiment in Vimperk with OT-64 wheeled armored transports vehicles
 36th Artillery Regiment in České Budějovice
 15th Separate Rocket Launcher Division in Vimperk with 9K52 Luna-M artillery rocket systems
 15th Command and Artillery Reconnaissance Battery in České Budějovice
 1st Anti-Aircraft Regiment in České Budějovice
 15th Reconnaissance Battalion in Vimperk
 15th Engineer Battalion in České Budějovice
 1st Signal Battalion in České Budějovice
 15th Supply Battalion in Kaplice
 15th Maintenance Battalion in České Budějovice
 1st Chemical Defence Battalion in České Budějovice
 1st Medical Battalion
 331st Heavy Artillery Brigade in Hranice
 31st Heavy Artillery Division with SS-1C Scud-B tactical ballistic missiles
 32nd Heavy Artillery Division with SS-1C Scud-B tactical ballistic missiles
 31st Artillery Base in Kostelec nad Orlicí servicing the missiles of the 331st Heavy Artillery Brigade
 332nd Cannon Artillery Brigade in Jičín
 Command and Artillery Reconnaissance Battery
 1st Cannon Artillery Division with 18x 130mm M1954 towed howitzers
 2nd Cannon Artillery Division with 18x 130mm M1954 towed howitzers
 3rd Cannon Artillery Division with 18x 152mm SpGH DANA self-propelled howitzers
 4th Cannon Artillery Division with 18x 152mm SpGH DANA self-propelled howitzers
 5th Cannon Artillery Division with 18x 152mm SpGH DANA self-propelled howitzers
 1st Engineer Brigade in Pardubice
 107th Engineer Battalion
 108th Engineer Battalion
 109th Engineer Battalion
 1st Engineer Roadblocking Battalion
 1st Engineer Transit Battalion
 4th Supply Brigade in Pacov
 41st Transport Battalion in Pacov
 42nd Transport Battalion in Pacov
 43rd Transport Battalion in Písek
 44th Transport Battalion in Kaplice
 45th Fuel Transport Battalion in Benešov
 97th Medical Evacuation Battalion in Pacov
 251st Anti-aircraft Missile Regiment in Kroměříž with 20x 2K12 Kub systems
 Headquarters Battery
 1st Firing Battery
 2nd Firing Battery
 3rd Firing Battery
 4th Firing Battery
 5th Firing Battery
 Technical Battery
 217th Anti-tank Regiment in Lešany
 1st Anti-tank Division with 12x 100mm vz. 53 anti-tank cannons and 6x BRDM-2 vehicles in the anti-tank variant with Konkurs anti-tank missiles
 2nd Anti-tank Division with 12x 100mm vz. 53 anti-tank cannons and 6x BRDM-2 vehicles in the anti-tank variant with Konkurs anti-tank missiles
 3rd Anti-tank Division with 12x 100mm vz. 53 anti-tank cannons and 6x BRDM-2 vehicles in the anti-tank variant with Konkurs anti-tank missiles
 72nd Pontoon Regiment in Kamýk nad Vltavou
 2nd Signal Regiment in Písek
 1st Signal Battalion
 2nd Signal Battalion 
 3rd Signal Battalion
 24th Long Distance Signal Communications Regiment in Písek
 4th Electronic Warfare Regiment in Český Krumlov 
 74th Special Purpose Electronic Intelligence Regiment in Horažďovice
 74th Radio Surveying HF Company
 74th Radio Surveying VHF Company
 74th Radio Surveying and Targeting Company
 74th Automatic Radio Surveying and Targeting Company
 74th Combat Support and Services Company
 5th Reconnaissance Artillery Division in Rychnov nad Kněžnou
 4th Radio-technical Battalion in Vimperk
 Light Radio-technical Company
 Heavy Radio-technical Company
 Signal Company
 105th Chemical Defence Battalion in Jaroměř
 14th Road Construction Battalion in Vimperk
 4th Radiation Center in Písek
 52nd Command and Reconnaissance Squadron in Havlíčkův Brod
 3rd Helicopter Detachment with 2x Mi-2 helicopters to support the 3rd Motor Rifle Division in wartime
 4th Helicopter Detachment with 2x Mi-2 helicopters to support the 4th Tank Division in wartime
 9th Helicopter Detachment with 2x Mi-2 helicopters to support the 9th Tank Division in wartime
 15th Helicopter Detachment with 2x Mi-2 helicopters to support the 15th Motor Rifle Division in wartime
 52nd Air Base and Electronic Support Company
 104th Unmanned Aerial Vehicle Reconnaissance Squadron in Strakonice with Tupolev Tu-143 VR-3 Rejs drones
 4th Signal and Radio-technical Services Company in Strakonice

Eastern Military District 

 Eastern Military District in Trenčín corresponding to the Slovak Socialist Republic. In case of war the district would have been supported by the 30th Guards Motor Rifle Division of the Soviet Union's Central Group of Forces.
 2nd Headquarters Battalion in Trenčín
 Eastern Military District Staff
 Operation Department
 Organization and Mobilization Department
 Penitentiary Battalion in Sabinov
 Regional Administrative Military Commands
 Political Department
 Signal Department
 2nd Signal Center in Trenčín
 42nd Signal Battalion in Trenčín
 2nd Computing Center in Trenčín
 Signal Specialist Training Center in Poprad
 2nd District Signal Depot and Repair in Nové Mesto nad Váhom
 Military Signal Office Banská Bystrica
 Military Signal Office Bratislava
 Military Signal Office Košice
 Intelligence Department
 Topographical Department
 2nd District Topographic Depot in Kremnica with detachments in Trenčín and Nemšová
 2nd District Map Production Detachment in Nemšová
 8th Department (Counter-espionage)
 Artillery and Rocket Troops Department
 Artillery and Rocket Armament Department
 Air Defence Troops Department
 Engineer Troops Department
 2nd District Engineer Depot in Nové Mesto nad Váhom
 6th Engineer Brigade in Sereď
 167th Engineer Battalion
 168th Engineer Battalion
 169th Engineer Battalion
 6th Engineer Roadblocking Battalion
 6th Engineer Transit Battalion
 Combat Training Department
 Military Training Area Kežmarok
 Military Training Area Lešť
 Military Training Area Turecký Vrch
 Military Training Area Kamenica nad Cirochou
 Chemical Troops Department
 2nd Radiation Center in Trenčín
 Civil Defence Department
 5th Civil Defence Regiment in Žilina
 6th Civil Defence Regiment in Malacky
 Tank and Automobile Department
 2nd District Tank and Automobile Depot in Nemšová
 4th Supply Brigade in Hlohovec
 18th Transport Battalion in Michalovce
 71st Transport Battalion in Prešov
 72nd Transport Battalion in Brezno
 75th Transport Battalion in Trnava
 76th Transport Battalion in Zvolen
 77th Transport Battalion in Hlohovec
 78th Transport Battalion in Žilina
 79th Fuel Transport Battalion in Michalovce
 99th Medical Evacuation Battalion in Komárno
 Political Department
 2nd District Political and Educational Material Depot in Trenčín
 Personnel Department
 Construction and Accommodation Department
 Regional Military Construction and Accommodation Office Banská Bystrica
 Regional Military Construction and Accommodation Office Bratislava
 Regional Military Construction and Accommodation Office Košice
 2nd Road Construction Company in Kežmarok
 3rd Road Construction Company in Záhorie
 Educational Department
 Air Force Military School in Prešov (Ground crews, flying crews and weather service school)
 Military School Martin (Infantry school)
 Military School Nitra (Tank and truck driving school)
 Military School Nové Mesto nad Váhom (Signal school)
 Military School Žilina (Chemical Defence, construction and accommodation school)
 Military School Liptovský Mikuláš (Air-defence school)
 Military School Valašské Meziříčí (Supply and transport school)
 Military Music School in Roudnice nad Labem
 Military Secondary School "Jan Žižka" Opava
 Military Secondary School "Jan Žižka" Moravská Třebová
 Military Secondary School "Jan Žižka" Prague
 Military Secondary School "Slovak National Uprising" in Banská Bystrica
 Fuels and Lubricants Department
 Equipment Department
 2nd District Chemical Depot in Čereňany
 2nd District Equipment Depot in Vrútky
 Equipment Maintenance Base Zvolen
 Equipment Maintenance Base Nitra
 Military Transport Department
 Regional Military Traffic Office Banska Bystrica
 Regional Military Traffic Office Bratislava
 Regional Military Traffic Office Košice
 Quartermaster Department
 2nd District Quartermaster Depot in Nitra
 Medical Department
 2nd District Medical Depot in Liptovský Mikuláš
 Military Hospital Bratislava with detachments in Plavecké Podhradie and Trnava
 Military Hospital Košice with a detachment Podolínec
 Military Hospital Ružomberok with a detachment in Vrútky
 2nd District Hygienic Epidemiological Detachment in Bratislava
 4th Veterinary Detachment in Trnava
 13th Tank Division in Topoľčany (in case of full mobilization would have also formed the 17th Tank Division)
 10th Tank Regiment in Martin
 15th Tank Regiment in Martin
 64th Tank Regiment in Levice
 8th Motor Rifle Regiment in Vajnory with BVP-1 tracked infantry fighting vehicles
 3rd Artillery Regiment in Senica
 16th Separate Rocket Launcher Division in Bratislava with 9K52 Luna-M  artillery rocket systems
 13th Command and Artillery Reconnaissance Battery in Topoľčany
 3rd Anti-Aircraft Regiment in Nitra
 13th Reconnaissance Battalion in Bratislava
 1st Engineer Battalion in Sereď
 13th Signal Battalion in Topoľčany
 13th Supply Battalion in Hlohovec
 13th Maintenance Battalion in Martin
 3rd Chemical Defence Battalion in Topoľčany
 3rd Medical Battalion in Topoľčany
 14th Tank Division in Prešov (in case of full mobilization would have also formed the 32nd Motor Rifle Division)
 60th Tank Regiment in Kežmarok
 103rd Tank Regiment in Humenné
 55th Motor Rifle Regiment in Trebišov with OT-64 wheeled armored transports vehicles
 63rd Motor Rifle Regiment in Michalovce with BVP-1 tracked infantry fighting vehicles
 49th Artillery Regiment in Brezno
 21st Separate Rocket Launcher Division in Brezno with 9K52 Luna-M  artillery rocket systems
 14th Command and Artillery Reconnaissance Battery in Prešov
 10th Anti-Aircraft Missile Regiment in Poprad with 2K12 Kub surface-to-air missile systems
 14th Reconnaissance Battalion in Prešov
 10th Engineer Battalion in Banská Bystrica
 14th Signal Battalion in Prešov
 14th Supply Battalion in Bardejov
 14th Maintenance Battalion in Prešov
 10th Chemical Defence Battalion in Prešov
 10th Medical Battalion in Prešov

Air Forces Command 

 Air Force Command in Prague
 3rd Air Transport Regiment at Prague Airport
 Mixed Special Purpose Squadron flying Mi-8PS-11 (VIP Transport)
 Air Traffic Control Center Prague Airport
 Air Traffic Control Center Bratislava Airport
 Air Force Logistics in Prague
 1st Air Force Construction Battalion in Opatovice nad Labem
 Air Force Maintenance Base Trenčín
 Air Force Maintenance Base Banská Bystrica
 6th Fuels and Lubricants Depot in Zemianske Kostoľany
 Air Defence Supply (Ammunition) Base in Dětřichov nad Bystřicí
 Central Air Storage Base in Štěpánov
 1st Central Technical Material Depot in Štěpánov
 2nd Central Technical Material Depot in Bruntál
 3rd Central Air Force Depot in Zvolen
 5th Central Air Force Depot in Maršová-Rašov
 6th Central Arms and Ammunition Depot in Konice
 Airborne Material and Equipment Depot in Čeladná

10th Air Army 
 10th Headquarters Battalion in Hradec Králové
 1st Mixed Air-Transport Regiment in Ostrava
 1st Squadron flying An-12 and An-26 aircraft
 2nd Squadron flying L-410 planes
 3rd Squadron flying Mi-17 helicopters
 25th Air Base Battalion
 52nd Electronic Support Battalion
 11th Helicopter Regiment in Plzeň
 1st Attack Squadron flying Mi-24D helicopters
 2nd Attack Squadron flying Mi-24V helicopters
 3rd Squadron flying Mi-17 helicopters
 111th Air Base Battalion 
 11th Signal and Electronic Support Company
 47th Air-Reconnaissance Regiment in Hradec Králové
 1st Tactical Reconnaissance Squadron flying MiG-21R
 2nd Tactical Reconnaissance Squadron flying Su-22M4
 3rd Tactical Reconnaissance Squadron flying Aero L-29R
 24th Air Base Battalion
 2nd Electronic Support Battalion in Pardubice
 12th Electronic Support Battalion in Hradec Králové
 1st Air Base Company "S"
 51st Helicopter Regiment in Prostějov
 1st Squadron flying Mi-8 helicopters
 2nd Squadron flying Mi-24D helicopters
 3rd Squadron flying Mi-17 helicopters
 51st Air Base Battalion
 51st Signal and Electronic Support Company
 10th Signal Regiment in Klecany
 Headquarters Company
 1st Signal Battalion
 2nd Signal Battalion
 3rd Signal Battalion
 10th Signal Cable Laying Battalion in Klecany
 10th Signal Center in Hradec Králové
 10th Radar Center in Hradec Králové
 2nd Air Force Construction Battalion in Bechyně
 3rd Air Force Construction Battalion in Plzeň
 46th Air Troops Maintenance Center in Brno
 49th Fuel Transport Battalion in Čáslav
 10th Air Army Base in Pardubice
 10th Air Army Technical Material Depot in Rakovník
 10th Air Army Ammunition Depot in Chrast with a detachment in Rakovník
 10th Air Army Signals and Electronic Support Maintenance Center in Olomouc
 Air Force Training Base in Kuchyňa for live fire exercises
 77th Air Base and Electronic Support Company
 1st Air Force Training Center in Ostrava training troops for maintenance units
 2nd Air Force Training Center in Olomouc training troops for air base operationing units
 Air Force Electronic Support Training Center in Prostějov training troops for electronic support units

1st Fighter Division 
 1st Fighter Division in Bechyně
 4th Fighter Regiment in Pardubice
 4th Fighter Regiment Command Post
 1st Fighter Squadron flying MiG-21MF
 2nd Fighter Squadron flying MiG-21MF
 3rd Fighter Squadron flying MiG-21MA
 6th Air Base Battalion
 22nd Electronic Support Battalion
 5th Fighter Regiment in Dobřany
 5th Fighter Regiment Command Post
 1st Fighter Squadron flying MiG-21MF
 2nd Fighter Squadron flying MiG-21MF
 3rd Fighter Squadron flying MiG-21MA
 18th Air Base Battalion
 3rd Electronic Support Battalion
 9th Fighter Regiment in Bechyně
 9th Fighter Regiment Command Post
 1st Fighter Squadron flying MiG-21PF
 2nd Fighter Squadron flying MiG-21PF
 3rd Fighter Squadron flying MiG-21PF
 4th Fighter Squadron flying MiG-21PFM
 10th Air Base Battalion
 10th Electronic Support Battalion
 31st Signal and Radio-technical Service Battalion in Bechyně
 31st Air Force Maintenance Battalion in Dobřany

34th Fighter-Bomber Division 
 Division Headquarters in Čáslav
 6th Fighter-Bomber Regiment in Přerov
 6th Fighter-Bomber Regiment Command Post
 1st Fighter-Bomber Squadron flying MiG-21MF
 2nd Fighter-Bomber Squadron flying Su-22M4
 11th Air Base Battalion
 1st Electronic Support Battalion
 20th Fighter-Bomber Regiment in Náměšť nad Oslavou
 20th Fighter-Bomber Regiment Command Post
 1st Fighter-Bomber Squadron flying Su-22M4
 2nd Fighter-Bomber Squadron flying Su-22M4
 19th Air Base Battalion
 51st Electronic Support Battalion
 28th Fighter Bomber Regiment in Čáslav
 28th Fighter-Bomber Regiment Command Post
 1st Fighter-Bomber Squadron flying MiG-23BN
 2nd Fighter-Bomber Squadron flying MiG-23BN
 21st Air Base Battalion
 7th Electronic Support Battalion
 30th Ground Attack Regiment in Pardubice
 30th Ground Attack Regiment Command Post
 1st Ground Attack Squadron flying Su-25K
 2nd Ground Attack Squadron flying Su-25K
 22nd Air Base Battalion
 12th Electronic Support Battalion
 34th Signal and Radio-technical Service Battalion in Čáslav
 34th Air Force Maintenance Battalion in Čáslav

Air Defence Command 

 Air Defence Command in Stará Boleslav (named: 7th Air Defence Army until 1976)
 Air Defence Central Command Post in Stará Boleslav
 7th Headquarters Battalion in Stará Boleslav
 17th Signal Regiment in Stará Boleslav
 7th Electronic Warfare Battalion in České Budějovice
 Command and Control Company
 On-board Radar Jammer Company
 Radio Navigation and VHF Signal Jammer Company
 7th Air Defence Signals and Electronic Support Maintenance Battalion in Stará Boleslav
 7th Air Defence Maintenance Battalion in České Budějovice
 Air Defence Weather Center in Prague
 Slovakia Weather Forecasting Center in Bratislava
 Air Defence Training Center in Karviná training troops for anti-aircraft missile units
 Air Defence Radio-technical Training Center in Zvolen training troops for radio-technical units

2nd Air Defence Division 
  2nd Air Defence Division in Brno
 2nd Air Defence Division Command Post in Rebešovice
 Ground Control Intercept 1 - Tuřany radar station
 Ground Control Intercept 2 - Stará Ves nad Ondřejnicí radar station
 Ground Control Intercept 3 - Hlohovec radar station
 Ground Control Intercept 4 - Močiar radar station
 Ground Control Intercept 5 - Mierovo radar station
 2nd Headquarters Battalion in Rebešovice
 8th Fighter Regiment at Brno–Tuřany Airport
 8th Fighter Regiment Command Post
 1st Fighter Squadron flying MiG-21PF
 2nd Fighter Squadron flying MiG-21PF
 3rd Fighter Squadron flying MiG-21PFM
 31st Air Base Battalion
 17th Electronic Support Battalion
 76th Anti-Aircraft Missile Brigade in Brno defending the city of Brno
 76th Anti-Aircraft Missile Brigade Command Post at Brno–Tuřany Airport
 1st Anti-Aircraft Missile Division in Rohozec with S-75M Volkhov high-altitude air defence systems
 2nd Anti-Aircraft Missile Division in Ketkovice  with S-75M Volkhov high-altitude air defence systems
 3rd Anti-Aircraft Missile Division in Vranovice with S-75M Volkhov high-altitude air defence systems
 4th Anti-Aircraft Missile Division in Kobeřice u Brna  with S-75M Volkhov high-altitude air defence systems
 5th Anti-Aircraft Missile Division in Brno-Líšeň with S-125 Neva mobile air defence systems
 6th Anti-Aircraft Missile Division in Sokolnice with S-125 Neva mobile air defence systems
 7th Anti-Aircraft Missile Division in Ořechov with S-125 Neva mobile air defence systems
 8th Anti-Aircraft Missile Division in Omice with S-125 Neva mobile air defence systems
 1st Technical Division in Neslovice
 Anti-Aircraft Missile Group of the 76th Anti-Aircraft Missile Brigade in Rapotice
 9th Anti-Aircraft Missile Division in Rapotice with S-200 Vega long range air defence systems
 10th Anti-Aircraft Missile Division in Rapotice with S-200 Vega long range air defence systems
 2nd Technical Division in Rapotice
 77th Anti-Aircraft Missile Regiment in Ostrava defending the city of Ostrava
 1st Anti-Aircraft Missile Division in Oldřišov with S-75M Volkhov high-altitude air defence systems
 2nd Anti-Aircraft Missile Division in Stará Ves nad Ondřejnicí with S-75M Volkhov high-altitude air defence systems
 3rd Anti-Aircraft Missile Division in Nový Jičín with S-75M Volkhov high-altitude air defence systems
 4th Anti-Aircraft Missile Division in Frýdek-Místek with S-75M Volkhov high-altitude air defence systems
 1st Technical Division in Frýdek-Místek
 186th Anti-Aircraft Missile Brigade in Pezinok defending the city of Bratislava
 1st Anti-Aircraft Missile Division in Lozorno with S-75M Volkhov high-altitude air defence systems
 2nd Anti-Aircraft Missile Division in Pezinok with S-75M Volkhov high-altitude air defence systems
 3rd Anti-Aircraft Missile Division in Rohovce with S-75M Volkhov high-altitude air defence systems
 4th Anti-Aircraft Missile Division in Kalinkovo with S-75M Volkhov high-altitude air defence systems
 5th Anti-Aircraft Missile Division in Stupava with S-75M Volkhov high-altitude air defence systems
 6th Anti-Aircraft Missile Division in Devínska Nová Ves with S-75M Volkhov high-altitude air defence systems
 7th Anti-Aircraft Missile Division in Rusovce with S-125 Neva mobile air defence systems
 8th Anti-Aircraft Missile Division in Most pri Bratislave with S-125 Neva mobile air defence systems
 1st Technical Division in Viničné
 2nd Radio-technical Brigade in Brno
 22nd Headquarters Battalion in Brno
 61st Radar Battalion in Brno
 Command Post of 61st Electronic Battalion in Brno-Tuřany
 Command Company in Sokolnice
 610th Radar Company in Sokolnice operating the Tuřany radar station
 611th Mobile Radar Company in Moravské Budějovice
 612th Mobile Radar Company in Božice
 613th Mobile Radar Company in Lavičky
 62nd Radar Battalion in Stará Ves nad Ondřejnicí
 Command Post of 62nd Electronic Battalion in Stará Ves nad Ondřejnicí
 Command Company in Stará Ves nad Ondřejnicí
 620th Radar Company in Stará Ves nad Ondřejnicí operating the Stará Ves nad Ondřejnicí radar station
 621st Mobile Radar Company in Chropyně
 622nd Mobile Radar Company in Polička
 63rd Radar Battalion in Hlohovec
 Command Post of 63rd Electronic Battalion in Hlohovec
 Command Company in Hlohovec
 630th Radar Company in Hlohovec operating the Hlohovec radar station
 631st Mobile Radar Company in Starý Hrozenkov
 632nd Mobile Radar Company in Šurany
 64th Radar Battalion in Zvolen
 Command Post of 64th Electronic Battalion in Močiar
 Command Company in Zvolen
 640th Radar Company in Močiar operating the Močiar radar station
 641st Mobile Radar Company in Cerovo
 642nd Mobile Radar Company in Veľká Ida
 65th Radar Battalion in Mierovo
 Command Post of 65th Electronic Battalion in Mierovo
 Command Company in Mierovo
 650th Radar Company in Mierovo operating the Mierovo radar station
 651st Mobile Radar Company in Moravská Nová Ves
 652nd Mobile Radar Company in Zohor
 653rd Mobile Radar Company in Rusovce
 22nd Signal Battalion in Brno
 Weather Radar and Meteorological Center Brno

3rd Air Defence Division 
  3rd Air Defence Division in Žatec
 3rd Air Defence Division Command Post in Větrušice
 Ground Control Intercept 1 - Lažany radar station
 Ground Control Intercept 2 - Stod radar station
 Ground Control Intercept 3 - Třebotovice radar station
 Ground Control Intercept 4 - Nepolisy radar station
 Ground Control Intercept 5 - Planá radar station
 Ground Control Intercept 6 - Drnov radar station
 3rd Headquarters Battalion in Žatec and Větrušice
 1st Fighter Regiment in České Budějovice
 1st Fighter Regiment Command Post
 1st Fighter Squadron flying MiG-23MF
 2nd Fighter Squadron flying MiG-23MF
 3rd Fighter Squadron flying MiG-23MF 
 4th Fighter Squadron flying MiG-23ML
 1st Air Base Battalion
 6th Electronic Support Battalion
 11th Fighter Regiment in Žatec
 11th Fighter Regiment Command Post
 1st Fighter Squadron flying MiG-29
 2nd Fighter Squadron flying MiG-29
 3rd Fighter Squadron flying MiG-29
 23rd Air Base Battalion
 5th Electronic Support Battalion
 71st Anti-Aircraft Missile Brigade in Drnov defending the Central Bohemian Region with the capital Prague
 71st Anti-Aircraft Missile Brigade Command Post in Drnov
 1st Anti-Aircraft Missile Division in Přestavlky with S-75M Volkhov high-altitude air defence systems
 2nd Anti-Aircraft Missile Division in Kačice with S-75M Volkhov high-altitude air defence systems
 3rd Anti-Aircraft Missile Division in Zdejcina with S-75M Volkhov high-altitude air defence systems
 4th Anti-Aircraft Missile Division in Stará Huť with S-75M Volkhov high-altitude air defence systems
 5th Anti-Aircraft Missile Division in Bukovany with S-75M Volkhov high-altitude air defence systems
 6th Anti-Aircraft Missile Division in Přehvozdí with S-75M Volkhov high-altitude air defence systems
 7th Anti-Aircraft Missile Division in Vlkava with S-75M Volkhov high-altitude air defence systems
 8th Anti-Aircraft Missile Division in Byšice with S-75M Volkhov high-altitude air defence systems
 9th Anti-Aircraft Missile Division in Miskovice with S-125 Neva mobile air defence systems
 10th Anti-Aircraft Missile Division in Jeneč with S-125 Neva mobile air defence systems
 11th Anti-Aircraft Missile Division in Točná with S-125 Neva mobile air defence systems
 12th Anti-Aircraft Missile Division in Velké Přílepy with S-125 Neva mobile air defence systems
 13th Anti-Aircraft Missile Division in Přelíc with S-125 Neva mobile air defence systems
 14th Anti-Aircraft Missile Division in Bratronice with S-125 Neva mobile air defence systems
 15th Anti-Aircraft Missile Division in Mořina with S-125 Neva mobile air defence systems
 16th Anti-Aircraft Missile Division in Mníšek pod Brdy with S-125 Neva mobile air defence systems
 1st Technical Division in Chyňava
 2nd Technical Division in Stará Boleslav
 Anti-Aircraft Missile Group of the 71st Anti-Aircraft Missile Brigade in Dobříš
 17th Anti-Aircraft Missile Division in Dobříš with S-200 Vega long range air defence systems
 18th Anti-Aircraft Missile Division in Dobříš with S-200 Vega long range air defence systems
 19th Anti-Aircraft Missile Division in Dobříš with S-200 Vega long range air defence systems
 3rd Technical Division in Dobříš
 185th Anti-Aircraft Missile Regiment in Kralovice defending the city of Plzeň
 2nd Anti-Aircraft Missile Division in Bochov with S-75M Volkhov high-altitude air defence systems
 3rd Anti-Aircraft Missile Division in Pernarec with S-75M Volkhov high-altitude air defence systems
 4th Anti-Aircraft Missile Division in Přeštice with S-75M Volkhov high-altitude air defence systems
 5th Anti-Aircraft Missile Division in Nové Mitrovice with S-75M Volkhov high-altitude air defence systems
 1st Technical Division in Hadačka
 3rd Radio-technical Brigade in Chomutov
 33rd Headquarters Battalion in Chomutov
 51st Radar Battalion in Hrušovany
 Command Post of 51st Electronic Battalion in Lažany
 Command Company in Lažany
 510th Radar Company Lažany operating the Lažany radar station
 511th Mobile Radar Company in Mikulášovice
 512th Mobile Radar Company in Martiněves
 52nd Radar Battalion in Stod
 Command Post of 52nd Electronic Battalion in Stod
 Command Company in Stod
 520th Radar Company in Stod operating the Stod radar station
 521st Mobile Radar Company in Poleň
 522nd Mobile Radar Company in Zhůří
 523rd Mobile Radar Company in Katovice
 53rd Radar Battalion in Třebotovice
 Command Post of 53rd Electronic Battalion in Třebotovice
 Command Company in Třebotovice
 530th Radar Company in Třebotovice operating the Třebotovice radar station
 531st Mobile Radar Company in Třeboň
 532nd Mobile Radar Company in Přední Výtoň
 533rd Mobile Radar Company in Horní Vltavice
 534th Mobile Radar Company in Nová Bystřice
 54th Radar Battalion in Nepolisy
 Command Post of 54th Electronic Battalion in Nepolisy
 Command Company in Nepolisy
 540th Radar Company in Nepolisy operating the Nepolisy radar station
 541st Mobile Radar Company in Chrášťany
 542nd Mobile Radar Company in Senožaty
 543rd Mobile Radar Company in Adršpach
 55th Radar Battalion in Planá
 Command Post of 55th Electronic Battalion in Planá
 Command Company in Planá
 550th Radar Company in Planá operating the Planá radar station
 551st Mobile Radar Company in Aš
 552nd Mobile Radar Company in Hřebečná
 56th Radar Battalion in Drnov
 Command Post of 56th Electronic Battalion in Drnov
 Command Company in Drnov
 560th Radar Company in Drnov operating the Drnov radar station
 561st Mobile Radar Company in Jesenice
 562nd Mobile Radar Company in Břasy
 563rd Mobile Radar Company in Ratiboř
 23rd Signal Battalion in Žatec
 Weather Radar and Meteorological Center Žatec

Regimental and Battalion Organization 
Below follow the organizations of the regiments in the Tank and Motor Rifle divisions:

By the end of the Cold War the standard main battle tank in the Czechoslovak tank regiments was the T-72M or T-72M1 of which Czechoslovakia had built 973. Some of the tank units in motor rifle divisions still fielded the locally produced T-54A. 
 Tank Regiment:
 Command Platoon
 Reconnaissance Company (3x Reconnaissance Platoons)
 3x Tank Battalions (each: Command Squad, 3x Tank Companies, Maintenance Squad, Supply Platoon, Battalion First Aid Station)
 Motor Rifle Company (Only in tank regiments of tank divisions)
 Rocket Launcher Battery (Command Platoon, 3x Firing Platoons with two RM-51 130mm multiple rocket launchers each, Supply Platoon)
 Anti-aircraft Battery (Command Squad, 2x Anti-aircraft Platoons with 6x M53/59 Praga twin 30mm self-propelled anti-aircraft guns each, Supply Squad. By 1989 only the 1st and 9th Tank divisions had replaced the 6x M53/59 Praga in their 2nd Anti-aircraft platoon with 4x 9K35 Strela-10 tracked self-propelled anti-aircraft missile systems. With the end of the Cold War further acquisitions for the other tank divisions were canceled.)
 Signal Company (Signal Platoon, Radio Platoon)
 Engineer Company (Engineer Platoon, Machinery Platoon)
 Chemical Defence Company (Command Squad, Radiation and Chemical Reconnaissance Platoon, Special Decontamination Platoon)
 Maintenance Company (Tracked Vehicles Workshop, Wheeled Vehicles Workshop, Armament Workshop, Signal Workshop, Special Workshop, Vehicle-towing Squad)
 Supply Company (2x Transport Platoons, Materiel Supply Squad, Water Treatment Squad, Food Supply Squad)
 Regimental First Aid Station

Motor rifle units fielded the locally produced BVP-1 tracked infantry fighting vehicle and the OT-64 wheeled armored transports vehicle.
 Motor Rifle Regiment:
 Command Platoon
 Reconnaissance Company (3x Reconnaissance Platoons)
 3x Motor Rifle Battalions (each: Command Squad, 3x Motor Rifle Companies, Mortar Battery, Anti-tank Guided Missile Platoon, Anti-aircraft Platoon,  Signal Squad, Maintenance Squad, Supply Platoon, Battalion First Aid Station)
 Tank Battalion (Command Squad, 3x Tank Companies, Maintenance Squad, Supply Platoon, Battalion First Aid Station)
 Anti-tank Guided Missile Battery (Command Squad, 3x Firing Platoons, ATGM Training Squad; armed with Konkurs anti-tank guided missiles)
 Rocket Launcher Battery (Command Platoon, 3x Firing Platoons with two RM-51 130mm multiple rocket launchers each, Supply Platoon)
 Anti-aircraft Battery (Command Squad, 3x Anti-aircraft Platoons with 6x M53/59 Praga twin 30mm self-propelled anti-aircraft guns each, Supply Squad. By 1989 only the 15th Motor Rifle division had replaced the 6x M53/59 Praga in its 2nd Anti-aircraft platoon with 4x 9K35 Strela-10 tracked self-propelled anti-aircraft missile systems. With the end of the Cold War further acquisitions for the other motor rifle divisions were canceled.)
 Signal Company (Signal Platoon, Radio Platoon)
 Engineer Company (Engineer Platoon, Machinery Platoon)
 Chemical Defence Company (Command Squad, Radiation and Chemical Reconnaissance Platoon, Special Decontamination Platoon)
 Maintenance Company (Tracked Vehicles Workshop, Wheeled Vehicles Workshop, Armament Workshop, Signal Workshop, Special Workshop, Vehicle-towing Squad)
 Supply Company (2x Transport Platoons, Materiel Supply Squad, Water Treatment Squad, Food Supply Squad)
 Regimental First Aid Station

Divisional artillery regiments were organized as follows: (Note: 1st Army divisional artillery regiments replaced their 122mm M1938 towed howitzers with 122mm 2S1 Gvozdika self-propelled howitzers in the late 1980s)
 Artillery Regiment:
 Command and Artillery Reconnaissance Battery
 1st Artillery Division with 18x 122mm M1938 towed howitzers (Command Platoon, 3x Firing batteries, Signal Platoon, Supply Platoon, Maintenance Platoon, First Aid Station)
 2nd Artillery Division with 18x 122mm M1938 towed howitzers (Command Platoon, 3x Firing batteries, Signal Platoon, Supply Platoon, Maintenance Platoon, First Aid Station)
 3rd Artillery Division with 18x 152mm SpGH DANA self-propelled howitzers in tank divisions, respectively 18x 152mm M1937 S towed howitzers in motor rifle divisions (Command Platoon, 3x Firing batteries, Signal Platoon, Supply Platoon, Maintenance Platoon, First Aid Station)
 Rocket-Launcher Division with 18x RM-70 122mm multiple rocket launchers (Command Platoon, 3x Firing batteries, Signal Platoon, Supply Platoon, Maintenance Platoon, First Aid Station)
 Anti-Tank Division with 12x 100mm vz. 53 anti-tank cannons and 6x BRDM-2 in the anti-tank version armed with Konkurs anti-tank missiles (Only in Motor Rifle Divisions; Command Platoon, 3x Firing batteries, Signal Platoon, Supply Platoon, Maintenance Platoon, First Aid Station)
 Fire Support Battery
 Sound-ranging and Reconnaissance Battery
 Supply Battery
 Maintenance Battery

Divisional anti-aircraft missile regiment were organized as follows and began to introduce either 20x 2K12 Kub or 20x 9K33 Osa surface-to-air missile systems in the early 1980s. When the Cold War ended all divisions except for the 13th Tank division and the 3rd and 15th Motor Rifle divisions had received Kub or Osa systems:
 Anti-aircraft Missile Regiment:
 Headquarters Battery
 1st Firing Battery
 2nd Firing Battery
 3rd Firing Battery
 4th Firing Battery
 5th Firing Battery
 Technical Battery

Civil defence regiments supported the authorities during times of national disaster:
 Civil Defence Regiment:
 Engineer Battalion
 Chemical Defence Battalion
 Premedical Care Battalion

Divisional reconnaissance battalions were organized as follows:
 Reconnaissance Battalion:
 Headquarters and Staff
 1st Reconnaissance Company
 2nd Reconnaissance Company
 Long Range Reconnaissance Company
 SIGINT Company
 Signal Platoon
 Support Platoon

Divisional separate rocket launcher divisions were organized as follows:
 Separate Rocket Launcher Division:
 Command Battery
 1st Firing Battery with 2x ballistic missile launchers
 2nd Firing Battery with 2x ballistic missile launchers
 Signal Battery
 Technical Support Platoon with 4x missile reloads

Divisional Chemical Defence battalions were organized as follows:
 Chemical Defence Battalion:
 Radiation and Chemical Reconnaissance Platoon
 1st Special Decontamination Company
 2nd Special Decontamination Company
 Maintenance Platoon

References

External links
 Units of the Czechoslovak People's Army 1950–1990

Military units and formations of Czechoslovakia
Military history of Czechoslovakia
Czechoslovak Socialist Republic
Wikipedia outlines